The Galo Arambarri Boarding House near Shoshone, Idaho is a stone building that was built during 1913-1914 by Basque stonemason Ignacio Berriochoa.  The building served as a boarding house for Basque men who worked as sheepherders in the area.  It was listed on the National Register of Historic Places in 1983.

It is a one-and-a-half-story  by  structure with a narrow bargeboard on the front gable end of its roof.   The stone walls on its sides rise  higher than the stone walls at the front and rear.  The long roof is interrupted by three shallow dormers facing to the side, each with a shallow gable roof and a narrow bargeboard.

References

Buildings and structures in Lincoln County, Idaho
Houses completed in 1914
Residential buildings on the National Register of Historic Places in Idaho
National Register of Historic Places in Lincoln County, Idaho